Roy Arturo Padilla Bardales (born February 7, 1963 in La Lima) is a retired Honduran football midfielder.

Club career
Padilla began his first steps at Atlético Alús in the lower leagues from San Pedro Sula. In 1982, he was signed by Marathón, making his first spell at the team. A year later, F.C. Motagua acquired his services. In 1985, he returned to Marathón, in which a headed goal gave his team the second championship in his history.

Padilla retired at Deportes Progreseño in 1994. He is now an electric technician.

International career
Padilla played in the youth national football teams of Honduras, more precisely the U-20 and U-23 categories. He never reached to play in the top category.

External links
  - La Prensa 

1963 births
Living people
People from Cortés Department
Association football midfielders
Honduran footballers
Honduras international footballers
C.D. Marathón players
F.C. Motagua players
C.D.S. Vida players
Liga Nacional de Fútbol Profesional de Honduras players